Edith Prentiss (February 1, 1952 – March 16, 2021) was an American disability rights activist.

Prentiss fought for accessibility in New York City's bus and subway systems, as well as police stations, restaurants, and public parks.

Early life and education
Prentiss was born in Central Islip, New York. She was one of six children of Robert Prentiss, an electrician, and Patricia Greenwood Prentiss, a social worker.

She graduated with a degree in sociology from Stony Brook University. She attended the College of Arts and Science at Miami University in Ohio.

Career
One of her early jobs was as an outreach caseworker for ARC XVI, a senior services center in Fort Washington.

She appears in the documentary film The Biggest Obstacle, which follows disability rights activist Jessica Murray.

Activism
Prentiss was a member of the community board for Washington Heights, Manhattan. She was also a founding member of the Advisory Committee for Transit Accessibility (ACTA), a volunteer group of community members set up to work with the New York City Transit Authority on a range of accessibility issues.

In 2004, Prentiss drew attention to the paucity of wheelchair-accessible taxis in New York. (At the time, there were currently three in use, and she described her chances of catching one as "like a unicorn".) The number subsequently increased to 231, and after a class action in which Prentiss was a plaintiff, the New York City Taxi and Limousine Commission undertook to make the city's fleet 50% accessible by 2020. This deadline was missed with the COVID-19 pandemic said to be the reason.

Disability

Prentiss had asthma, and in later life became diabetic. She started using a wheelchair in her late 40s as her asthma became severe.

Awards and honors
In May 2021, she was inducted into the New York State Disability Rights Hall of Fame.

On July 22, 2021, the MTA honored Prentiss with a plaque on the 175th Street station elevator - her home station.

The filmmaker Arlene Schulman studied Prentiss for the last three years of her life. Schulman planned to create a documentary with the title Edith Prentiss: Hell on Wheels which Prentiss objected to as she thought it was too mild.

References

External links

1952 births
2021 deaths
American disability rights activists
People from Islip (town), New York
Activists from New York City
People from Washington Heights, Manhattan
Stony Brook University alumni
Miami University alumni